Wilga is a river in the Lesser Poland Voivodeship of Poland. The right tributary of the Vistula River, it feeds off in Kraków on Volyn Boulevard.

In the upper reaches of the river there are minnows, chubs and a few brook trouts.

The river drains the Wieliczka Foothills and its mains, mainly built of Flysch works. Severely polluted, especially on the estuarian section Wilga is classified in the lower grades of water quality.

See also
List of rivers of Poland

References

Rivers of Poland
Rivers of Lesser Poland Voivodeship